Mortimer Mishkin (December 13, 1926 – October 2, 2021) was an American neuropsychologist, and winner of the 2009 National Medal of Science awarded in Behavior and Social Science.

Life and career
Born in Fitchburg, Massachusetts in December 1926, Mishkin graduated from Dartmouth College in 1946, and took a 1949 M.A. and 1951 Ph.D. from McGill University under Donald O. Hebb.  His Ph.D. thesis was partly directed by surgeon and theorist Karl H. Pribram.

In 2010 Mishkin won the National Medal of Science for his five decades of work on the mechanisms of cognition and memory, and the discovery that the brain processes memories in two separate processes:  cognitive memory dealing with events and fresh information, and behavioral memory related to skills and habits.

As of 2016 Mishkin was Chief of the Section on Cognitive Neuroscience, Laboratory of Neuropsychology, National Institute of Mental Health, chartered to explore neurobiological mechanisms of perception and memory. He is also recognised for his role in establishing the two streams hypothesis on the organisation of extrastriate visual cortex (with Leslie Ungerleider).

Mishkin died in October 2021, at the age of 94.

Awards 
 APA Award for Distinguished Scientific Contributions to Psychology, 1985
 William James Fellow Award, awarded by the Association for Psychological Science, 1989
 Ariëns Kappers Medal, 1989
 Karl Spencer Lashley Award, for "pioneering analysis of the memory and the perceptual systems of the brain, and his seminal contributions to the understanding of the higher nervous system function", 1996
 Metlife Foundation Award for Medical Research in Alzheimer's Disease, 1999
 National Medal of Science, 2010
 Grawemeyer Award given by the University of Louisville, 2012
 NAS Award in the Neurosciences, 2016

References

External links 

 2006 video oral history interview with Mishkin on History of Neuroscience

1926 births
2021 deaths
People from Fitchburg, Massachusetts
American cognitive neuroscientists
National Medal of Science laureates
Scientists from Massachusetts
Dartmouth College alumni
McGill University alumni
20th-century American scientists
21st-century American scientists
Members of the National Academy of Medicine